The KHL Best Sniper Award is awarded annually to the leading goal scorer in the Kontinental Hockey League (KHL). The current holder is Dmitrij Jaskin of Dynamo Moscow, who scored 32 goals during the 2020–21 season.

Winners
Key

References

Kontinental Hockey League trophies and awards